Robert Oliver O'Neal (born February 1, 1971) is a former American football cornerback who played one season, for the Indianapolis Colts. He also played in NFL Europe for the Amsterdam Admirals.

Early life
Robert O'Neal was born on February 1, 1971, in Atlanta, Georgia. He went to high school at Clarkston (GA).

College career
O'Neal played college football at Clemson. In his freshmen year he set a school record with eight interceptions. He was named All-ACC three times.

College awards and honors
3x All-ACC (1989, 1991, 1992)

Professional career

Miami Dolphins

O'Neal was drafted in the 6th round (164) by the Miami Dolphins in the 1993 NFL draft. But he did not play for them.

Indianapolis Colts

In 1994 he played two games for the Indianapolis Colts.

Amsterdam Admirals

In 1995 he played in NFL Europe for the Amsterdam Admirals. He had one interception in 1995. He remained there until 1997. After 1997 he did not play anymore.

References

Living people
1971 births
American football cornerbacks
Indianapolis Colts players
Amsterdam Admirals players
Clemson Tigers football players
Players of American football from Atlanta